Rasulpur is a village in India.

Rasulpur (also spelled Rasoolpur or Rasool Pur) may refer to:

India
 Rasulpur, Zira, a village in Firozpur district, Punjab
 Rasulpur Gogumau, a town in Kanpur Dehat district, Uttar Pradesh
 Rasulpur, Phillaur, a village in Phillaur tehsil, Jalandhar District, Punjab State
 Jangal Rasoolpur, a village in Gorakhpur, Uttar Pradesh
 Rasoolpur Soor,  a village in Balrampur district, Uttar Pradesh
 Rasoolpur, Raibareli, a village in Raebareli district, Uttar Pradesh
 Rasoolpur Abad, a village in Bijnor district, Uttar Pradesh
 Rasulpur, Nawabganj, a village in Unnao district, Uttar Pradesh
 Rasulpur, Purwa, a village in Unnao district, Uttar Pradesh
 Rasulpur, Amawan, a village in Raebareli district, Uttar Pradesh
 Rasulpur, Bachhrawan, a village in Raebareli district, Uttar Pradesh
 Rasulpur, Bardhaman, a village in Bardhaman district, West Bengal
 Rasulpur River, a river of West Bengal

Pakistan
 Hassam, Rasulpur, a village in tehsil Kharian
 Rasoolpur Muftian, is a village in Rajanpur, Punjab
 Rasoolpur Muftian, a village in the district of Gujrat
 Rasulpur, Jhang, a town in Jhang, Punjab

Bangladesh
 Rasulpur Union, a union of Ghatail Upazila, Tangail District

See also
 Rasul (surname)